Jack Shearer may refer to:

 Jack Shearer (priest) (1926–2001), Church of Ireland clergyman
 Jack Shearer (rugby union) (1896–1963), New Zealand rugby union player